Wahl Glacier is a glacier, 10 nautical miles (18 km) long, flowing northwest from Grindley Plateau to enter upper Lennox-King Glacier westward of Mount Mackellar. It is named by Advisory Committee on Antarctic Names (US-ACAN) for Bruno W. Wahl (1928 – 2000), a German-American physicist and rocket scientist. In 1961-1962, Dr. Wahl wintered over at McMurdo Station with four U.S. Naval personnel to measure levels of the Van Allen radiation belt for the U.S. space program. He was the first German to ever visit the South Pole in 1961. Dr. Bruno Wahl and his colleague Collins were first to scale Mt. Dromedary.

References

External links
 Wahl Glacier Station
 Wahl Glacier Research

Glaciers of the Ross Dependency
Shackleton Coast